Harry W. Schilling (September 21, 1887 – March 20, 1958) was an American farmer and politician.

Born in Onalaska, Wisconsin, Schilling went to the Onalaska public schools and took the short agriculture course at the University of Wisconsin–Madison and was a farmer. He served on the creamery board, on the town board, the La Crosse County, Wisconsin Board of Supervisors, and as director of the Midway District School Board. Schilling served in the Wisconsin State Assembly in 1935, 1937, 1947, 1949, 1951 as a Progressive and a Republican. He also ran for the Wisconsin State Senate on the Wisconsin Progressive Party ticket and lost the election.

Notes

1887 births
1958 deaths
People from Onalaska, Wisconsin
University of Wisconsin–Madison College of Agricultural and Life Sciences alumni
Farmers from Wisconsin
County supervisors in Wisconsin
School board members in Wisconsin
Wisconsin city council members
Wisconsin Progressives (1924)
20th-century American politicians
Republican Party members of the Wisconsin State Assembly